5th Cavalry, 5th Cavalry Corps, V Cavalry Corps, 5th Cavalry Division, 5th Cavalry Brigade or 5th Cavalry Regiment may refer to:

Corps
 5th Cavalry Corps (Soviet Union)
 5th Cavalry Corps (Russian Empire)
 V Cavalry Corps (Grande Armée)
 V Cavalry Corps (German Empire)

Divisions
 5th Cavalry Division (Argentina)
 5th Light Cavalry Division (France)
 5th Cavalry Division (German Empire)
 2nd Indian Cavalry Division, which was designated the 5th Cavalry Division from November 1916 to March 1918 in France
 5th Cavalry Division (India)
 5th Guards Cavalry Division, of the Soviet Army

Brigades
 5th (Mhow) Cavalry Brigade, of the Indian Army
 5th (Secunderabad) Cavalry Brigade, of the Indian Army from September 1920 to 1923
 5th Cavalry Brigade (United Kingdom)

Regiments
 5th Cavalry (India), a former regiment of the Indian Army
 5th Bengal Light Cavalry, a former regiment of the East India Company
 5th Bengal European Cavalry, a former regiment of the East India Company
 5th Cavalry Regiment (United States)
 5th Armored Cavalry Regiment, of the United States Army
 5th Arkansas Cavalry Regiment, a Confederate regiment of the American Civil War
 5th Georgia Cavalry, a Confederate regiment of the American Civil War
 5th Michigan Volunteer Cavalry Regiment, a Union regiment of the American Civil War
 5th Missouri Cavalry Regiment (Union), a Union regiment of the American Civil War
 5th Ohio Cavalry, a Union regiment of the American Civil War
 5th Virginia Cavalry, a Confederate regiment of the American Civil War